The Dark Is Light Enough is a 1954 verse play by Christopher Fry, which he wrote for Dame Edith Evans and set during the Hungarian Revolution of 1848. It is formally a comedy, but Fry subtitled the play 'A Winter Comedy' to signal its tragic qualities.

The play, directed by Peter Brook, premiered at the Aldwych Theatre in London, UK, in May 1954.

Original London cast

 Countess Rosmarin Ostenburg – Edith Evans
 Richard Gettner – James Donald
 Gelda (Daughter of the Contess) – Margaret Johnston
 Colonel Janik – John Glen
 Count Peter Zichy – Jack Gwillim
 Stefan (Son of the Contess) – Peter Barkworth
 Kassel (Doctor) – Peter Bull
 Bella – Violet Farebrother

Original Broadway cast

The extended preview season started on Broadway at the ANTA Playhouse on 23 February 1955 and closed on 23 April 1955, after a total of 69 performances. It was directed by Guthrie McClintic.

 Countess Rosmarin Ostenburg – Katharine Cornell
 Richard Gettner – Tyrone Power
 Gelda (Daughter of the Contess) – Marian Winters
 Colonel Janik – Arnold Moss
 Count Peter Zichy – Christopher Plummer
 Stefan (Son of the Contess) – Paul Roebling
 Kassel (Doctor) – William Podmore
 Bella – Eva Condon
 Belmann – John Williams
 Fourth Soldier – Dario Barri
 Third Soldier – Jerome Gardino
 Beppy – Ted Gunther
 Jakob – Donald Harron
 Willi – Charles Macaulay
 Rusti, A Hungarian corporal – Sydney Pollack

Adaptations
A 90 minute BBC TV version was broadcast in January 1958, starring Edith Evans as the Countess and Peter Wyngarde as Richard Gettner. It was directed by Stuart Burge.

References

External links
 
 

1954 plays
Plays by Christopher Fry